Key Colony Beach is a municipality in the middle of the Florida Keys, Monroe County, Florida, United States. The population was 790 at the 2020 census.

History
Before the early 1950s, Shelter Key (on which most of Key Colony Beach is located) was a  low-lying island.

Around 1956–1957, residents of nearby Marathon began discussing incorporating the entire area. Sadowski was not keen on having his development swallowed up into Marathon, so he began the process of incorporating the island into its own city. The Florida Legislature passed legislation in June 1957 allowing incorporation, which local residents passed unanimously in September, thus creating today's Key Colony Beach.

Incorporation became a blessing in 1960, when much of the city was destroyed by Hurricane Donna.  As a separately incorporated city, Key Colony Beach received its own federal grant to rebuild; nearby Marathon (not yet incorporated) had to settle for a portion of the grant given to Monroe County.  However, the storm (and then the takeover of Cuba by Fidel Castro) depressed real estate prices, and it took several years to for prices to stabilize.

Geography
Key Colony Beach is located at  (24.724515, –81.017928).  Most of the city is located on an island formerly known as Shelter Key; a small part of the city is on Fat Deer Key, where the Sadowski Causeway, the only road entering the city, connects to U.S. 1 (the Overseas Highway) and the city of Marathon, on the east side of the city. Marathon lies to the northwest, north, and northeast of Key Colony Beach, while the Atlantic Ocean is to the south.

Along the Sadowski Causeway are some charter fishing boats and a dockside restaurant called Sparky's Landing. At the south end of the causeway, West Ocean Drive branches off first to the right and East Ocean Drive soon after branches to the left. On West Ocean Drive is the police station, along with the post office and town hall. In the same vicinity is a small park with a fountain and a gazebo. The entire ocean-facing side of West Ocean Drive is lined by various condominium complexes, while the side facing Marathon houses the Key Colony Inn and a par-3 golf course. Starting at the far end of East Ocean Drive, streets are numbered one to fifteen east to west, and run from south to north toward Shelter Bay. The most notable buildings along East Ocean Drive are the Key Colony Beach Motel and the Key Colony Beach Club. At the tip of West Ocean Drive is Sunset Park, the place closest to where a woman was fatally struck by a spotted eagle ray. Many news reports were recorded from this park overlooking the shallows where the Vaca Cut meets the Atlantic Ocean.

Demographics

2020 census

As of the 2020 United States census, there were 790 people, 320 households, and 181 families residing in the city.

2000 census
As of the census of 2000, there were 788 people, 422 households, and 253 families residing in the city. The racial makeup of the city was 99.11% White, 0.51% African American, and 0.38% from two or more races. Hispanic or Latino of any race were 4.44% of the population.

There were 422 households, out of which 8.3% had children under the age of 18 living with them, 55.9% were married couples living together, 3.1% had a female householder with no husband present, and 40.0% were non-families. 31.3% of all households were made up of individuals, and 16.4% had someone living alone who was 65 years of age or older.  The average household size was 1.87 and the average family size was 2.25.

In the city, the population was spread out, with 7.6% under the age of 18, 3.6% from 18 to 24, 14.3% from 25 to 44, 36.8% from 45 to 64, and 37.7% who were 65 years of age or older.  The median age was 58 years. For every 100 females, there were 99.5 males.  For every 100 females age 18 and over, there were 96.8 males.

The median income for a household in the city was $45,577, and the median income for a family was $53,750. Males had a median income of $28,654 versus $27,143 for females. The per capita income for the city was $40,631.  About 3.9% of families and 7.4% of the population were below the poverty line, including 10.2% of those under age 18 and 3.9% of those age 65 or over.

Education
It is in the Monroe County School District. It is zoned to Stanley Switick Elementary School (K-8) in Marathon.

Notable people
 Charley Lau, baseball player and coach

References

External links
 

Cities in Monroe County, Florida
Cities in Florida
Populated coastal places in Florida on the Atlantic Ocean
Beaches of Monroe County, Florida
Beaches of Florida